Monumento El Cacahual, situated south of Santiago de las Vegas and north of Bejucal in Cuba is a monument to and the resting place of the remains of Antonio Maceo, second-in-command of the Cuban Army of Independence, and his aide-de-camp Francisco Gómez Toro. The present monument, the third on the site, was started in 1944 and completed in 1951.

Buildings and structures completed in 1951
Monuments and memorials in Cuba
20th-century architecture in Cuba